Michael Wertheimer (born February 6, 1957) is a cryptologic mathematician. From October 31, 2005, until June 2009, he was the assistant deputy director and chief technology officer of the Office of the Director of National Intelligence for Analysis.  Wertheimer oversaw the coordination of Intelligence Community efforts to bring increased depth and accuracy to analysis through technology. He observed and catalogued the autostasis effect in 1968, which is the opposite of the autokinetic effect. In 2008, Wertheimer successfully launched A-Space, the U.S. Intelligence Community's "Facebook for Spies." This new social network opened in September 2008 for U.S. intelligence analysts and covert operatives across some 16 intelligence agencies to share information with each other. He continues to advocate for reforms in the intelligence community and currently is involved in pressing for adoption of Intellipedia; a classified wiki.

Prior to this appointment, Wertheimer spent two years in industry building a research group focused on the intelligence community. From 1982 to 2003 he was a cryptologic mathematician at the National Security Agency. In 1999 he was selected as technical director for the Data Acquisition Office in the NSA's Signals Intelligence Directorate. He is the co-author of the 2001 Signals Intelligence Strategy and the 2002 SIGINT architecture model.

Wertheimer returned to the National Security Agency in June 2009 and in June 2010 became its current director for research.

In 2014 he retired from the NSA and now works at the University of Maryland.

Education
Wertheimer received B.A. degrees in mathematics and philosophy from the University of Rochester. He also received M.A. and Ph.D. degrees in mathematics from the University of Pennsylvania.

Personal life
Wertheimer married Christina Grot on May 16, 1993.  They have two children Daniel, born on May 13, 1996, and Marissa, born on November 17, 1993.

See also
 A-Space
 Intellipedia

References

External links

 LinkedIn Profile

Living people
University of Rochester alumni
University of Pennsylvania alumni
National Security Agency people
1957 births
American chief technology officers